Furcotanilla is a genus of ants in the subfamily Leptanillinae containing the single species Furcotanilla furcomandibula. The genus is close to Protanilla, from where the type species Protanilla furcomandibula (now Furcotanilla furcomandibula) was transferred from by Xu (2012). Its only species is known from Yunnan, China, where it nests in the soil and forages on the ground. Queens and males are unknown.

References

Leptanillinae
Monotypic ant genera
Hymenoptera of Asia